Karolien is a Dutch, and  Swedish feminine given name that is a diminutive form of Carolina and Caroline as well as an alternate form of Carolin.  Notable people referred to by this name include the following:

Given name
Karolien Florijn (born 1998), Dutch rower
Karolien Grosemans (born 1970), Belgian politician

See also

Karolin (name)
Karoline (disambiguation)

Notes

Dutch feminine given names
Swedish feminine given names